Velli Vizha is a 1972 Indian Tamil-language film, written and directed by K. Balachander. The film stars Gemini Ganesan, Jayanthi, Vanisri and S. Varalakshmi. It was released on 11 August 1972.

Plot 
Bala, married to Banu and son of Sivakami, is a rich and a celebrated tennis player with plethora of fans. Banu is a timid, obedient housewife and they have children too. Sheela is his fan and is the polar opposite of Banu. She is loud, obnoxious and a go-getter. Her brother Joseph happens to be a friend of Bala. She stalks Bala, befriends him and goes on to befriend Sivakami and Banu too. Sivakami begins to see her mannerisms as disgusting while Banu admires her courage and trusts her husband. Joseph, however, overhears Sheela while she is sleep-talking and confronts her about her love for Bala which she denies. She then gives in and decides to leave the family alone. Fate strikes and Banu dies leaving Bala desolate and heartbroken. Sivakami asks Sheela now to marry Bala but she, having given her word, leaves.

Sivakami however starts letter correspondence with the family and becomes a surrogate mother to the children "bringing" them up through letters. Manorama, family friend, is the only one who understands and always has understood the relationship. A point comes where Sheela comes to visit the now adult children and Manorama's husband Aramuthan recognizes her and tells the children the flashback. Indirectly blaming Sheela for Banu's death, they hate her and throw her out fearing she might marry Bala and become a heir to the property. Bala, in anger, gives up all the property, marries Sheela to legitimize her sacrifices and moves out.

Cast 
 Gemini Ganesan as Bala
 Jayanthi as Banu
 Vanisri as Sheela
 S. Varalakshmi as Sivakami, Bala's mother
 V. Gopalakrishnan as Joseph
 Thengai Srinivasan as Aramuthan
 Manorama as Komalam
 S. V. Sahasranamam as Postman Kumarasamy
 S. N. Lakshmi as Kumarasamy's wife
 Srividya as Kalyani
 Vidhubala
 K. R. Savithri as Radha
 Shanmugasundaram as Raja
 V. S. Raghavan Church Father

Production 
While shooting for the film, Balachander suffered a heart attack at the age of 42, and spent three-and-a-half weeks in hospital.

Soundtrack 
The music was composed by V. Kumar, with lyrics by Vaali.

Release and reception 
Velli Vizha was released on 11 August 1972. When the film was released in Malaysia, posters of leaders of the Indian Communist Party shown in the background were censored. Ananda Vikatan wrote .

References

External links 
 

1970s Tamil-language films
1972 films
Films directed by K. Balachander
Films with screenplays by K. Balachander